Billy Simpson's House of Seafood and Steaks, also known as The Ebony Table, Kushner's Sea Food Grill, Minoux Bakery, Harry C. Johnson & Son, or The Kaieteur, was a restaurant on Georgia Avenue in the Northwest area of Washington, D.C. It was listed on the National Register of Historic Places on March 17, 2009.  It is notable for the role it played "in the social and political culture of the District of Columbia's African American community. The restaurant offered fine dining to the city's black middle and upper classes.  Many notable people in politics, government, and entertainment frequented the establishment. The owner, William W. "Billy" Simpson, was an avid supporter of the era's civil rights and anti-war causes.

The building that housed the restaurant is located at 3815 Georgia Avenue NW and was constructed in 1923 as one in a row of four attached brick buildings.

In April 2012, the French Bistro Chez Billy was opened on the site.

References

African-American history of Washington, D.C.
African-American middle class
African-American upper class
Commercial buildings on the National Register of Historic Places in Washington, D.C.
Restaurants in Washington, D.C.
Restaurants on the National Register of Historic Places
Petworth (Washington, D.C.)